Alvin and the Chipmunks is a 2007 video game based on the film of the same name. It follows The Chipmunks as they play their way from small venues (such as a high school prom or a civic center) to massive crowds at Burning Munk and ultimately Rockathonapalooza. The soundtrack features 40 songs, including "All the Small Things" by Blink-182, "It's Tricky" by Run-D.M.C., "Everything You Want" by Vertical Horizon, and "Heartbreak Hotel" by Elvis Presley. The gameplay itself is similar to other rhythm games such as Rock Band and Guitar Hero. Jason Lee reprised his role as David Seville in the story cutscenes while Ross Bagdasarian, Jr. and Janice Karman reprise their roles from the 1980s-2000s cartoons.

A second installment, Alvin and the Chipmunks: The Squeakquel, was released on December 1, 2009 to coincide with the release of the film of the same name.

Plot
The Chipmunks play at various venues to save their favorite music club. Each venue is unlocked once a trio-set of songs have been completed.

Reception

The game received generally negative reviews. GameRankings gave the game a 37/100 for the Wii version based on 2 reviews, a 42/100 for the PS2 version based on 2 reviews, a 39/100 based on 1 review, and a 45/100 for the DS version without any reviews.

References

External links
Official game website
IGN page
Yahoo! Finance hosted press release about the game

Alvin and the Chipmunks
Wii games
Nintendo DS games
PlayStation 2 games
Windows games
2007 video games
Band-playing video games
Multiplayer and single-player video games
Video games based on films
Video games developed in the United States
Sensory Sweep Studios games
Brash Entertainment games